William Bradbury (3 April 1933 – 9 August 1999) was an English professional footballer who scored 102 goals from 257 appearances in the Football League playing for Coventry City, Birmingham City, Hull City, Bury, Workington and Southport. He played as an inside forward.

Career
Bradbury was born in Matlock, Derbyshire. As a youngster he played for the Rowsley and District Youth League XI, and went on to turn professional with Coventry City. He played 24 league games in four years with Coventry and then spent a short time with Birmingham City, where the number of top-class forwards – all five reached double figures of goals scored in the 1954–55 season – made it hard for him to break through. He joined Hull City in October 1955.

Despite joining halfway through the season, Bradbury finished as Hull's leading scorer, with nine league goals as the club were relegated from the Second Division. For the next three seasons he also finished as leading scorer, with 18, 19 and 30 league goals respectively; the latter total remains (as of 2009) Hull's post-Second World War league record, and made a major contribution to the club's promotion back to the Second Division in the 1958–59 season. Hull teammate Andy Davidson described him thus:

In February 1960, Bradbury joined Bury for a fee of £5,000. He was unable to keep his place in the 1960–61 season, asked for a transfer, and spent the remainder of the season in the Fourth Division with Workington. He then had a season at Southport, another as player-coach with Wigan Athletic, where he scored 13 goals in 27 Cheshire League appearances, and finished his career with Prescot Cables and Kirkby Town.

Bradbury died of a heart attack in Chesterfield, Derbyshire, in 1999 at the age of 66.

Bill Bradbury attended the Ernest Bailey Grammar School in Matlock, Derbyshire from 1944 to 1949. I (Neil Ollerenshaw) was in the same form with Bill throughout those years. He was a reasonable scholar, but not academically minded. His passion was football and he was a leading member of the daily, lunchtime, pickup game of football on the school tennis courts, using a tennis ball of course. I was told that his father, at that time a groundskeeper for the Chairman of Derbyshire Stone Ltd. had been a professional footballer and played for Leyton Orient. Bill's closest friends at school were Roy Griffiths and Lou Finney.

References

External links

1933 births
1999 deaths
People from Matlock, Derbyshire
Footballers from Derbyshire
English footballers
Association football forwards
Coventry City F.C. players
Birmingham City F.C. players
Hull City A.F.C. players
Bury F.C. players
Workington A.F.C. players
Southport F.C. players
Wigan Athletic F.C. players
Prescot Cables F.C. players
English Football League players
Knowsley United F.C. players